Ushlinova Peak is the sharp ice-covered peak of elevation 2130 m in the west foothills of Avery Plateau on Loubet Coast in Graham Land, Antarctica.  It surmounts Widdowson Glacier to the west and a tributary to that glacier to the northeast.

The peak is named after Donka Ushlinova (1880–1937), a participant in the Bulgarian liberation movement in Macedonia, much decorated for her bravery in the 1912–1918 wars of national unification.

Location
British mapping in 1976.

Maps
Antarctic Digital Database (ADD). Scale 1:250000 topographic map of Antarctica.  Scientific Committee on Antarctic Research (SCAR), 1993–2016.
British Antarctic Territory. Scale 1:200000 topographic map. DOS 610 Series, Sheet W 66 64. Directorate of Overseas Surveys, Tolworth, UK, 1976.

Notes

References
 Bulgarian Antarctic Gazetteer. Antarctic Place-names Commission. (details in Bulgarian, basic data in English)
 Ushlinova Peak. SCAR Composite Antarctic Gazetteer

External links
 Ushlinova Peak. Adjusted Copernix satellite image

Mountains of Graham Land
Bulgaria and the Antarctic
Loubet Coast